The 2013 Asian Women's Junior Handball Championship (12th tournament) took place in Almaty from June 23–29. It acts as the Asian qualifying tournament for the 2014 Women's Junior World Handball Championship.

Results

Final standing

References

Asian handball

External links
www.asianhandball.org

International handball competitions hosted by Kazakhstan
Asian Women's Junior Handball Championship, 2013
Asia
Asian Handball Championships